Erald Hysi (born 13 August 1986 in Vlorë) is an Albanian football player who currently plays as a goalkeeper for Flamurtari Vlore in the Albanian Superliga. Between 2012 and 2013 he was a member of Flamurtari Vlore futsal team.

Honours 
Flamurtari
 Albanian Cup (1): 2013-14

References

1986 births
Living people
Footballers from Vlorë
Albanian footballers
Association football goalkeepers
KF Vlora players
Flamurtari Vlorë players
KF Bylis Ballsh players